Gardenia cornuta, commonly known as Tonga gardenia, Natal gardenia or horned gardenia, is a species of plant in the family Rubiaceae native to southern Africa.

Though specimens were collected in 1870, the species was not described until 1906.

References

cornuta